Janet Ancel is an American politician from Calais, Vermont who has served in the Vermont House of Representatives since 2005.

Political career
Janet Ancel is the Chair of the House Committee on Ways and Means. She also serves on the Joint Legislative Management Committee, the Joint Transportation Oversight Committee, and the Legislative Advisory Committee on the State House.

Prior to becoming a Representative, Ancel served as Legal Counsel to Governor Howard Dean from 1993-2000 and as Vermont Tax Commissioner from 2000-2002.

References

21st-century American politicians
21st-century American women politicians
Democratic Party members of the Vermont House of Representatives
Women state legislators in Vermont
Stanford University alumni
Year of birth missing (living people)
Living people